Gruppo della Carega is a massif in Veneto, Italy. Its highest peak, Cima Carega, has an elevation of 2,259 metres.

References 

Mountains of Veneto